Sidymella rubrosignata is a species of crab spiders found in Australia. It is a common spider, often seen on Dianella plants.

Like all thomisid spiders, it does not make a web, but lies in wait for prey to appear nearby. Their prey is insects, or occasionally other small spiders.

Description 

Often these spiders are a well camouflaged green, making their presence difficult to discern on green leaves or flowers. Occasionally they may be yellow, light brown or reddish. Males are 4.5 mm long, female 8 mm. Males are slimmer and smaller.

The front two pairs of legs are much longer than the other two pairs of legs. The abdomen is trapezium shaped, with a pair of dorsal humps, with a red patch on each of them. The cephalothorax is pear-shaped.

Egg sac 

The egg sac is in a leaf, with the tip folded back to cover the eggs. The leaf edges are curled around by silk to provide protection. The eggs are 0.8 mm in diameter, nonsticky, and cream in colour. There are usually 20 to 35 eggs in each egg sac.

Taxonomy 
The species was first described by in 1874 by Ludwig Koch in the genus Stephanopis. It was later placed in the genus Sidyma by R. de Delmas in 1917; however, it was discovered that a genus of moths had already been called Sidyma, so in 1942, Strand provided the replacement name Sidymella.

References

 A guide to Australian Spiders - Densey Clyne SBN 17 004724 AUS 68-595 page 59
 Australian Spiders in Colour - Ramon Mascord 1970 SBN 589 07065 7 page 58
 Australian Spiders, John Child. Library of Congress Catalogue Card No 67-30800 page 61
 http://research.amnh.org/entomology/spiders/catalog/Thomisidae.html

Thomisidae
Spiders of Australia
Fauna of New South Wales
Spiders described in 1874